Minhajul Abedin (born 12 September 1997) is a Bangladeshi cricketer. He made his Twenty20 debut for Uttara Sporting Club in the 2018–19 Dhaka Premier Division Twenty20 Cricket League on 27 February 2019. He made his List A debut for Uttara Sporting Club in the 2018–19 Dhaka Premier Division Cricket League on 20 March 2019. He made his first-class debut on 7 November 2021, for Dhaka Metropolis in the 2021–22 National Cricket League.

References

External links
 

1997 births
Living people
Bangladeshi cricketers
Dhaka Metropolis cricketers
Uttara Sporting Club cricketers